Ted Gioia (born October 21, 1957) is an American jazz critic and music historian. He is author of eleven books, including Music: A Subversive History, The Jazz Standards: A Guide to the Repertoire, The History of Jazz and Delta Blues. He is also a jazz musician and one of the founders of Stanford University's jazz studies program.

Early years
Gioia grew up in an Italian-Mexican household in Hawthorne, California, and later earned degrees from Stanford University and Oxford University, as well as an MBA from the Stanford Graduate School of Business. He served for a period as an adviser to Fortune 500 companies while with the Boston Consulting Group and McKinsey & Company. When Gioia worked amidst Silicon Valley's venture capital community on Sand Hill Road, he was known as the "guy with the piano in his office." Gioia is also owner of one of the largest collections of research materials on jazz and ethnic music in the Western United States.

Gioia is the brother of poet Dana Gioia.

Career

Gioia is the author of several books on music, including Music: A Subversive History (2019), West Coast Jazz (1992), The Jazz Standards: A Guide to the Repertoire (2012), and The Birth (and Death) of the Cool (2009). A second updated and expanded edition of The History of Jazz was published by Oxford University Press in 2011. Love Songs: The Hidden History, published by Oxford University Press in 2015, is a survey of the music of courtship, romance, and sexuality; it completes a trilogy of books on the social history of music that includes Work Songs (2006) and Healing Songs (2006). All three books have been honored with ASCAP's Deems Taylor Award. In his study of love songs, Gioia contends that innovations in the history of this music came from Africa and the Middle East.

In 2006, Gioia was the first to expose, in an article in the Los Angeles Times, the FBI files on folk and roots music icon Alan Lomax. He founded jazz.com in December 2007 and served as president and editor until 2010. He has also created a series of websites on contemporary fiction.

Gioia is also a jazz pianist and composer. He has produced recordings featuring Bobby Hutcherson, John Handy, and Buddy Montgomery.

In 2021, Gioia announced on Twitter his forthcoming collaboration with Ted-Ed on an animated introduction to jazz history.

Awards and honors
Lifetime Achievement Award in Jazz Journalism, Jazz Journalists Association, 2017.

The Dallas Morning News has called Ted Gioia "one of the outstanding music historians in America." His concept of "post-cool" described in his book The Birth (and Death) of the Cool, was selected as one of the Big Ideas of 2012 by Adbusters magazine.

ASCAP Deems Taylor Award: The Imperfect Art (1989), Work Songs (2006), Healing Songs (2006), Love Songs: The Hidden History (2015).

Books

 Music: A Subversive History, Basic Books (2019); 
 The Jazz Standards: A Guide to the Repertoire, Oxford University Press (2012); 
 The History of Jazz, Oxford University Press
 1st edn (1997); 
 2nd edn (2011); 
 3rd edn (2021); 
 How to Listen to Jazz, Basic Books (2016); 
 The Birth (and Death) of the Cool, Speck Press (2009); 
 Delta Blues: The Life and Times of the Mississippi Masters who Revolutionized American music, Norton (2008); 
 West Coast Jazz: Modern Jazz in California 1945-1960, Oxford University Press
 1st edn (1992); 
 2nd edn (1998); 
 The Imperfect Art: Reflections on Jazz and Modern Culture, Oxford University Press (1988); 
 Love Songs: The Hidden History, Oxford University Press (2015); 
 Work Songs, Duke University Press (2006); 
 Healing Songs, Duke University Press (2006);

Selected discography

 The End of the Open Road, Ted Gioia Trio, Quartet Records Q1001 (1988); 
 Recorded June 9–11, 1986, and October 19, 1987, Menlo Park, California
 Tango Cool, Ted Gioia Trio, Quartet Record QCD1006 (1990); 
 Recorded March 31, 1989, and April 7, 1990, San Francisco
 The City is a Chinese Vase (1998)

References

External links

 

1957 births
Living people
People from Hawthorne, California
Jazz musicians from California
American jazz pianists
American male pianists
American male jazz musicians
American musicians of Mexican descent
American people of Italian descent
Hispanic and Latino American musicians
Stanford University alumni
Jazz writers
20th-century American pianists
21st-century American pianists
20th-century American male musicians
21st-century American male musicians